The Citroën 2CV ( is an air-cooled front-engine, front-wheel-drive economy car introduced at the 1948 Paris Mondial de l'Automobile and manufactured by Citroën for model years 1948–1990. This page excludes production data for the mechanically similar Citroën Ami, Citroën Dyane, Citroën Acadiane, Citroën Méhari, Citroën Bijou, and Citroën FAF models.

Production data by year

Engines

Standard saloon

Utility

Sahara

References

Sources

Citroën 2CV